Millersburg is an unincorporated community and census-designated place in Millersburg Township, Mercer County, Illinois, United States. As of the 2020 census, it had a population of 54.

Demographics

Notable people
Dora Doxey, tried for murder in 1910 and found not guilty

References

Census-designated places in Mercer County, Illinois
Census-designated places in Illinois
Unincorporated communities in Mercer County, Illinois
Unincorporated communities in Illinois